Tazehabad (also Romanized as Tāzehābād; also known as Tazekhabad) is a village in Gil Dulab Rural District, in the Central District of Rezvanshahr County, Gilan Province, Iran. At the 2006 census, its population was 397, in 110 families.

References 

Populated places in Rezvanshahr County